The fifth term of the Sejm of the Republic of Poland lasted from 19 October 2005 to 7 September 2007.  Elections were held on 25 September 2005, with all 460 members being elected.

Officers

Members of Sejm

mandates expired during the term of office

2005-2007)